Caleana disjuncta, commonly known as the little duck orchid, is a species of orchid that is found in Western Australia but with a few disjunct populations in Victoria and South Australia. It has a single smooth leaf and a single greenish yellow and red flower with a flattened labellum, the calli only near its tip.

Description
The dorsal sepal is pressed against the column which has broad wings, forming a bucket-like shape. The labellum is flattened and only about one-third of the outer part of the labellum is covered with glossy black glands or calli. Flowering occurs from October to December.

Taxonomy and naming
The little duck orchid was first formally described in 2003 by David Jones from a specimen collected in the Cox Scrub Conservation Park. Jones gave it the name Paracaleana disjuncta and published the description in The Orchadian. A 2014 paper reported that molecular studies had suggested that Caleana and Paracaleana are congeneric, so the present species was renamed Caleana disjuncta. The Western Australian Herbarium and several recent field guides to the orchids of Western Australia retain the name Paracaleana disjuncta. The specific epithet (disjuncta) is a Latin word meaning "separate", "distinct", "different" or "remote", referring to the widely separated populations of this orchid.

Distribution and habitat
Caleana disjuncta mainly grows in shrubland between Margaret River and Israelite Bay in Western Australia but there are small populations at three locations in the south-east of South Australia and two in Victoria in and near the Grampians National Park.

References

disjuncta
Endemic orchids of Australia
Orchids of South Australia
Orchids of Victoria (Australia)
Orchids of Western Australia